Julia Clair (born 20 March 1994) is a French ski jumper. She was born in Saint-Dié-des-Vosges, and represents the club SC Xonrupt. Her junior career includes a silver medal at the 2013 Junior World Championships in Erzurum, and a bronze medal at the 2014 Junior World Championships in Val di Fiemme. She competed at the 2014 Winter Olympics in Sochi, in the ladies normal hill.

References

1994 births
Living people
People from Saint-Dié-des-Vosges
French female ski jumpers
Ski jumpers at the 2014 Winter Olympics
Ski jumpers at the 2022 Winter Olympics
Olympic ski jumpers of France
Sportspeople from Vosges (department)